Harleigh Cemetery is a historic rural cemetery located in both Collingswood and Camden, New Jersey. Harleigh Cemetery and Crematorium is one of the oldest cemeteries in New Jersey. Named Camden County Veterans Cemetery in 2007, the current president is Louis Cicalese. The cemetery has been listed on the New Jersey Register of Historic Places since 1995 (as ID #2829).

Notable burials

David Baird Sr. (1839–1927), United States Senator from New Jersey from 1918–1919.
David Baird Jr. (1881–1955), United States Senator from New Jersey from 1929–1930.
Henry Charlton Beck (1902–1965), journalist, folklorist, author of a series of books about New Jersey history and forgotten towns
Ella Reeve Bloor (1862–1951), radical labor organizer.
William J. Browning (1850–1920), represented New Jersey's 1st congressional district from 1911–1920.
Albert E. Burling (1891 - 1960),  Justice of the New Jersey Supreme Court from 1947 to 1960.
George C. Burling (1834–1885), Union Army officer during the American Civil War, serving mostly as Colonel and commander of the 6th New Jersey Volunteer Infantry.
Ralph W. E. Donges (1875 - 1974),  Justice of the New Jersey Supreme Court,  1930-1948
Carl McIntire (1906–2002), founder of and minister in the Bible Presbyterian Church.
Charlie Rice (1920–2018), jazz drummer
William Joyce Sewell (1835–1901), United States Senator from New Jersey from 1881–1887 and 1895–1901.
John F. Starr (1818–1904), United States Senator from New Jersey from 1863–1867.
Nick Virgilio (1928–1989), haiku poet.
Joseph F. Wallworth (1876–1933), President of the New Jersey Senate
Walt Whitman (1819–1892), Essayist and Poet.
Charles A. Wolverton (1880–1969), represented New Jersey's 1st congressional district from 1927–1959.

References

External links

Harleigh Cemetery at Interment.net
Harleigh Cemetery at The Political Graveyard
Harleigh Cemetery at Find A Grave

Camden, New Jersey
Collingswood, New Jersey
Cemeteries in Camden County, New Jersey
1885 establishments in New Jersey
Buildings and structures completed in 1885
Rural cemeteries